Brent Moloney (born 28 January 1984) is a former Australian rules footballer who played for the Brisbane Lions, Melbourne Football Club and Geelong Football Club in the Australian Football League (AFL).

Early life
Originating from Warrnambool, Victoria, Moloney supported the Demons as a child and his hero was Allen Jakovich, who played for Melbourne. Moloney played in the TAC Cup for the Geelong Falcons.

AFL career

Geelong Football Club

He was drafted in the 2003 pre-season draft by Geelong, and made his debut with Geelong Football Club in round 14, 2003. In 2003 Moloney received an AFL Rising Star nomination.

Melbourne Football Club
Moloney was traded to the Melbourne Football Club following the 2004 AFL season, after which he would play 21 games for Melbourne in 2005.

Injury sidelined him for much of the next three seasons, seeing him play only playing 27 games. He injured his shoulder in Melbourne's Round 11 match against Collingwood in 2008, sidelining him for the rest of the season.

Following a successful recovery from shoulder surgery, he was able to train injury-free for the whole of the 2009 pre-season, and he went on to play every game for the season finding his form back with many consistent performances. His return to his consistent best in 2009 was highlighted by his career-best statistics in every category except kicks – he had the most number of disposals, handballs, goals and marks of any season in his career to that point.

In 2011 Brent received 19 Brownlow Medal votes, and his form saw him awarded Melbourne's best and fairest.

Brisbane Lions
In September 2012, Moloney became the AFL's first free agent, when he announced that he would leave the Melbourne Football Club. On 10 October 2012, he agreed to accept an offer from the Brisbane Lions.

On 11 August 2014, Moloney retired from football following an Achilles tendon injury.

Controversy
In April 2011, Moloney was evicted from a Melbourne nightclub for drunkenness the night after a match. As a consequence, he was stripped of the vice-captaincy.

Moloney was reinstated to the vice captaincy on 9 June, following good form, counselling for his drinking problem and a vote by the entire playing list.

In June 2013, after Melbourne coach Mark Neeld was sacked, Moloney took to Instagram and posted a photo on his profile, saying "karma is a bitch". Moloney had been dropped sporadically during his final year at Melbourne, which was Neeld's first as head coach.

Statistics

|- style="background-color: #EAEAEA"
! scope="row" style="text-align:center" | 2003
|style="text-align:center;"|
| 32 || 8 || 1 || 5 || 56 || 18 || 74 || 21 || 8 || 0.1 || 0.6 || 7.0 || 2.3 || 9.3 || 2.6 || 1.0
|-
! scope="row" style="text-align:center" | 2004
|style="text-align:center;"|
| 32 || 15 || 5 || 6 || 130 || 60 || 190 || 55 || 16 || 0.3 || 0.4 || 8.7 || 4.0 || 12.7 || 3.7 || 1.1
|- style="background:#eaeaea;"
! scope="row" style="text-align:center" | 2005
|style="text-align:center;"|
| 22 || 21 || 2 || 8 || 267 || 95 || 362 || 72 || 56 || 0.1 || 0.4 || 12.7 || 4.5 || 17.2 || 3.4 || 2.7
|-
! scope="row" style="text-align:center" | 2006
|style="text-align:center;"|
| 22 || 7 || 1 || 4 || 72 || 37 || 109 || 27 || 12 || 0.1 || 0.6 || 10.3 || 5.3 || 15.6 || 3.9 || 1.7
|- style="background:#eaeaea;"
! scope="row" style="text-align:center" | 2007
|style="text-align:center;"|
| 22 || 10 || 5 || 3 || 92 || 74 || 166 || 24 || 26 || 0.5 || 0.3 || 9.2 || 7.4 || 16.6 || 2.4 || 2.6
|-
! scope="row" style="text-align:center" | 2008
|style="text-align:center;"|
| 22 || 8 || 2 || 0 || 94 || 73 || 167 || 47 || 38 || 0.3 || 0.0 || 11.8 || 9.1 || 20.9 || 5.9 || 4.8
|- style="background:#eaeaea;"
! scope="row" style="text-align:center" | 2009
|style="text-align:center;"|
| 22 || 21 || 7 || 3 || 229 || 283 || 512 || 98 || 78 || 0.3 || 0.1 || 10.9 || 13.5 || 24.4 || 4.7 || 3.7
|-
! scope="row" style="text-align:center" | 2010
|style="text-align:center;"|
| 22 || 18 || 2 || 8 || 192 || 235 || 427 || 40 || 86 || 0.1 || 0.4 || 10.7 || 13.1 || 23.7 || 2.2 || 4.8
|-style="background:#eaeaea;"
! scope="row" style="text-align:center" | 2011
|style="text-align:center;"|
| 22 || 22 || 9 || 4 || 282 || 227 || 509 || 41 || 124 || 0.4 || 0.2 || 12.8 || 10.3 || 23.1 || 1.9 || 5.6
|-
! scope="row" style="text-align:center" | 2012
|style="text-align:center;"|
| 22 || 15 || 3 || 5 || 136 || 120 || 256 || 26 || 52 || 0.2 || 0.3 || 9.1 || 8.0 || 17.1 || 1.7 || 3.5
|-style="background:#eaeaea;"
! scope="row" style="text-align:center" | 2013
|style="text-align:center;"|
| 3 || 16 || 8 || 5 || 160 || 156 || 316 || 41 || 84 || 0.5 || 0.3 || 10.0 || 9.8 || 19.8 || 2.6 || 5.3
|-
! scope="row" style="text-align:center" | 2014
|style="text-align:center;"|
| 3 || 5 || 1 || 3 || 43 || 58 || 101 || 8 || 28 || 0.2 || 0.6 || 8.6 || 11.6 || 20.2 || 1.6 || 5.6
|- class="sortbottom"
! colspan=3| Career
! 166
! 46
! 54
! 1753
! 1436
! 3189
! 500
! 608
! 0.3
! 0.3
! 10.6
! 8.7
! 19.2
! 3.0
! 3.7
|}

Honours and achievements
Individual
 Keith 'Bluey' Truscott Trophy: 2011
 Australia international rules football team: 2005
 AFL Rising Star nominee: 2004 (Round 10)

References

External links

 
 

1984 births
Living people
Australian rules footballers from Victoria (Australia)
Melbourne Football Club players
Geelong Football Club players
Geelong Falcons players
South Warrnambool Football Club players
Brisbane Lions players
Keith 'Bluey' Truscott Trophy winners
Casey Demons players
Tiwi Bombers Football Club players
Australia international rules football team players
Sandringham Football Club players
Wilston Grange Football Club players